Juliane House (born 1942) is a German linguist and translation studies scholar.

Biography
House received a degree in English and Spanish Translation and International Law from the University of Heidelberg, Germany. Later, she worked as a translator and researcher. She earned her BEd, MA and PhD in Linguistics and Applied Linguistics at the University of Toronto, Canada.

She is a senior member of the German Science Foundation’s Research Centre on Multilingualism at the University of Hamburg, where she has directed several projects on translation and interpreting. Her research interests include translation theory and practice, contrastive pragmatics, discourse analysis, politeness theory, English as lingua franca, intercultural communication, and global business communication.

She is the president of IATIS.

Juliane House is currently the Chair of Linguistics Programs and Director of the PhD in Applied Linguistics: Discourse in English Language Teaching, Testing or Translation/Interpreting Program at Hellenic American University.

Publications
House's published works include:
A Model for Translation Quality Assessment (1977 and revisited 1997)
Let's Talk and Talk About It: A Pedagogic Interactional Grammar of English (1981) with Willis Edmondson
Interlingual and Intercultural Communication (1986) with Shoshana Blum-Kulka
Cross-Cultural Pragmatics: requests and apologies (1989) with Shoshana Blum-Kulka and Gabriele Kasper
Einführung in die Sprachlehrforschung (1993, revised ed. 2011) with Willis Edmondson
Misunderstanding in Social Life. Discourse Approaches to Problematic Talk. (2003) with Gabriele Kasper and Steven Ross
Multilingual Communication (2004) with Jochen Rehbein.
Translation (2009).
Translatory Action and Intercultural Communication (2009) with Kristin Bührig and Jan ten Thije.
English as a Lingua Franca. Special Issue of Intercultural Pragmatics vol 6, No. 2. 2009.
Convergence and Divergence in Language Contact Situations. (2010) with Kurt Braunmüller.
Globalization, Discourse, Media. In a Critical Perspective. (2010) with Anna Duszak and Lukasz Kumiega.
Impoliteness in Germany. (2010) Intercultural Pragmatics 7:4. 2010
 House, J. (2015). Translation quality assessment: Past and present. Routledge.
 House, J. (2016). Translation as communication across languages and cultures. Routledge, Taylor & Francis Group.
 House, J. (2018). Translation: The basics (First edition). Routledge/Taylor & Francis Group.

Bibliography
Probst, J.: Ein Kompliment in Ehren … Aspekte eines "höflichen" Sprechaktes in mehreren Sprachen, in: Übersetzen, Interkulturelle Kommunikation, Spracherwerb und Sprachvermittlung - das Leben mit mehreren Sprachen. Festschrift für Juliane House zum 60. Geburtstag, Zeitschrift für Interkulturellen Fremdsprachenunterricht, 2003

References

1942 births
Living people
Heidelberg University alumni
University of Toronto alumni
Linguists from Germany
German translation scholars
Academic staff of the University of Hamburg
German women writers
German translators